A statue of baseball pitching star and Hall of Famer Warren Spahn is installed outside Oklahoma City's Chickasaw Bricktown Ballpark, in the U.S. state of Oklahoma.

External links
 Warren Spahn at cultureNOW

Baseball culture
Bricktown, Oklahoma City
Cultural depictions of American men
Cultural depictions of baseball players
Monuments and memorials in Oklahoma
Outdoor sculptures in Oklahoma City
Sculptures of men in Oklahoma
Statues in Oklahoma
Statues of sportspeople